Pleasant View is an unincorporated community in Fayette County, in the U.S. state of Ohio.

History
Pleasant View had its start around 1875 when James Flax opened a country store there.

References

Unincorporated communities in Fayette County, Ohio
Unincorporated communities in Ohio